A  Psychiatric Mobile Response Team (PMRT) is a unit that provides psychiatric evaluations of suspects who appear to be in some form of mental crisis. In the United Kingdom they are called Crisis Resolution and Home Treatment Team (CRHTT).

United States

California
In Los Angeles County, a PMRT is mainly focused on preventing adults with mental disabilities from being sent into a detention. The PMRT responds within 60 minutes of a referral.

Connecticut
In Connecticut, a PMRT is a team of mental health workers. This may include Psychiatrists, Registered Nurses, MSW's (Social Workers), and Psychiatric Technicians. These units may intervene in both Juvenile and Adult situations.

FBI
The FBI had an MPERT that investigated the massacre in Waco, Texas in 1993. At that time, Alen J. Salerian was the head of the FBI's MPERT unit.

United Kingdom
The United Kingdom has a similar service run by NHS mental health trusts, Crisis Resolution and Home Treatment Team (CRHTT). A 24-hour service that provides same day initial psychiatric assessment and short-term treatment in the community for people who might otherwise need admission to an acute psychiatric unit.

See also
Emergency psychiatry

References

Emergency medical services
Mental health organizations in the United States
Deinstitutionalization in the United States